Scirè may refer to:

 , a Type 212 submarine of Marina Militare, commissioned 19 February 2007
 Scirè (Ethiopia), occidental area of Tigray Region